Macaria oweni, Owen's larch looper or Owen's angle moth, is a moth of the family Geometridae. The species was first described by Louis W. Swett in 1907. It is found in North America from Newfoundland to west-central Alberta, south in the east to northern New England.

The wingspan is about 23 mm. Adults are on wing from June to mid-July in Alberta. There is probably one generation per year.

The larvae feed on Larix laricina.

External links

Maier, C. T.; Lemmon, C. R.; Fengler, J. M.; Schweitzer, D. F. & Reardon, R. C. (2004). "Owen's Larch Looper (Macaria oweni)". Caterpillars on the Foliage of Conifers in the Northeastern United States. USDA Forest Service. Archived from the original October 11, 2008.

Macariini
Moths described in 1907